Arcelia Arredondo García (born 17 April 1957) is a Mexican politician from the National Action Party. From 2000 to 2003 she served as Deputy of the LVIII Legislature of the Mexican Congress representing Guanajuato.

References

1957 births
Living people
Politicians from Guanajuato
Women members of the Chamber of Deputies (Mexico)
National Action Party (Mexico) politicians
21st-century Mexican politicians
21st-century Mexican women politicians
Universidad Autónoma Metropolitana alumni
Universidad de Guanajuato alumni
Deputies of the LVIII Legislature of Mexico
Members of the Chamber of Deputies (Mexico) for Guanajuato